Breath and Taxes is the third EP by Spahn Ranch, released in 1994 by Zoth Ommog Records. The song "Breath and Taxes" contains the lyrics "Charles, Charles in a jar" in direct reference to Charles Manson.

Track listing

Personnel
Adapted from the Breath and Taxes liner notes.

Spahn Ranch
 Matt Green – sampler, keyboards, sequencing, mixing (4)
 Athan Maroulis – lead vocals
 Rob Morton – programming, sampler, mixing (4)

Production and design
 Hype Graphics – design
 Judson Leach – recording, remix (1, 5), mixing (4), remixer (1, 3-5)

Release history

References

External links 
 Breath and Taxes at Discogs (list of releases)

1994 EPs
Remix EPs
Spahn Ranch (band) albums
Zoth Ommog Records EPs